State Correctional Institution – Waymart is a medium-security correctional facility located in Canaan Township, Wayne County, Pennsylvania, outside Waymart, in the extreme northeast corner of the commonwealth. SCI Waymart also houses a unit (Forensic Treatment Unit) for mentally disabled males needing psychiatric care and treatment. The facility is located on the site of the former Farview State Hospital.

Opening of SCI Waymart
The opening of this institution was pressed due to the 1989 riots at State Correctional Institution - Camp Hill. From the opening until 1995, the correctional facility and the still-open Farview State Hospital operated jointly,  unique for the commonwealth. In 1995, the Department of Public Welfare turned over hospital operations to the Department of Corrections.

See also
 List of Pennsylvania state prisons

References

External links
 Penna. Department of Corrections - SCI Waymart

Prisons in Pennsylvania
Buildings and structures in Wayne County, Pennsylvania
1989 establishments in Pennsylvania